Francisco Felipe was a Spanish attendant of the first wife of Henry VIII of England, Katherine of Aragon.

He was also one of the contributors to the Spanish Chronicle.

References

Year of birth missing
16th-century deaths
16th-century Spanish people
16th-century English people